Abbot Pass is a pass, in Clackamas County, Oregon. U.S. Route 26 passes, over Abbot Pass.

Abbot Pass is named for Henry Larcom Abbot.

In the area of Abbot Pass

The cities of

 Government Camp 
 Pine Grove 

are near, to Abbot Pass.

Abbot Pass is also near Timothy Lake, and Warm Springs Highway.

References

External links and references

 A map

Mountain passes of Oregon